The Combellack–Blair House is a historic house in the Gold Rush town of Placerville, in El Dorado County, California, built in 1895.  The landmark house was placed on the National Register of Historic Places (NRHP) on February 14, 1985.

History
The Combellack–Blair House, designed in the Queen Anne Style of the Late Victorian architecture era,  was built by William Hill Combellack in 1895.  One of the residence's early owners operated Combellack's, a store on Main Street in Placerville. The Arthur Blair family purchased it in 1924.  It served as a  bed and breakfast for several years, but is now a private residence.

Thomas Kinkade 
The home was featured in a Thomas Kinkade painting, Victorian Christmas.  Kinkade, who grew up in Placerville, felt the house was the kind that "begged to be painted"; he placed it in an idealized turn of the 20th century Christmas scene.

See also
National Register of Historic Places listings in El Dorado County, California

References

Houses in El Dorado County, California
Placerville, California
History of El Dorado County, California
Houses on the National Register of Historic Places in California
Houses completed in 1895
Queen Anne architecture in California
Victorian architecture in California
National Register of Historic Places in El Dorado County, California